The 1996 Rutgers Scarlet Knights football team represented Rutgers University in the 1996 NCAA Division I-A football season. In their first season under head coach Terry Shea, the Scarlet Knights compiled a 2–9 record, were outscored by opponents 380 to 143, and finished in seventh place in the Big East Conference. The team's statistical leaders included Mike Stephans with 918 passing yards, Chad Bosch with 523 rushing yards, and Steven Harper with 321 receiving yards.

Schedule

Roster

References

Rutgers
Rutgers Scarlet Knights football seasons
Rutgers Scarlet Knights football